Rijeka is a city in Croatia.

Rijeka may also refer to:

 HNK Rijeka, a football club from Rijeka
 11706 Rijeka, a minor planet
 Rijeka, Olovo, a village in Bosnia and Herzegovina
 Rijeka (Trnovo), a village in Bosnia and Herzegovina
 Rijeka (Višegrad), a village in Bosnia and Herzegovina
 Rijeka, Vitez, a village in Bosnia and Herzegovina
 Rijeka Crnojevića, a place in Montenegro

See also 
 Fiume (disambiguation)
 Kriva Rijeka (disambiguation)